The 1997 South American Cross Country Championships took place on February 22–23, 1997.  The races were held at the Santa Lucía Golf Club in Comodoro Rivadavia, Argentina.

Complete results, results for junior and youth competitions, and medal winners were published.

Medallists

Race results

Senior men's race (12 km)

Note: Athletes in parentheses did not score for the team result.  (n/s: nonscorer)

Junior (U20) men's race (8 km)

Note: Athletes in parentheses did not score for the team result.  (n/s: nonscorer)

Youth (U17) men's race (4 km)

Note: Athletes in parentheses did not score for the team result.  (n/s: nonscorer)

Senior women's race (6 km)

Note: Athletes in parentheses did not score for the team result.  (n/s: nonscorer)

Junior (U20) women's race (4 km)

Note: Athletes in parentheses did not score for the team result.  (n/s: nonscorer)

Youth (U17) women's race (3 km)

Note: Athletes in parentheses did not score for the team result.  (n/s: nonscorer)

Medal table (unofficial)

Note: Totals include both individual and team medals, with medals in the team competition counting as one medal.

Participation
According to an unofficial count, 82 athletes (+ 1 guest) from 6 countries (+ 1 guest country) participated.

 (34)
 (20)
 (12)
 (11)
 (4)
 (1)

Guest country:
 (1)

See also
 1997 in athletics (track and field)

References

External links
 GBRathletics

South American Cross Country Championships
South American Cross Country Championships
South American Cross Country Championships
South American Cross Country Championships
1997 in South American sport
Cross country running in Argentina
February 1997 sports events in South America